Krilon is a trilogy of novels by the Swedish author Eyvind Johnson, Grupp Krilon ("Group Krilon", 1941), Krilons resa ("Krilon's journey", 1942), Krilon själv ("Krilon himself", 1943), published in one volume as Krilon in 1948.

Written and published during World War II, the novel is partly a realistic story set in contemporary Stockholm and partly an allegory of the events during the war that criticises nazism and fascism as well as Sweden's neutrality during the war.

Plot summary
The main character is Johannes Krilon, a middle aged real estate broker in Stockholm. He has formed a conversation group with six middle class friends that regularly meet to discuss various topics. Krilon's business is eventually attacked by two real estate rivals and he struggles to keep his group united against the aggression.

Critical reception
The novel was generally praised by the leading contemporary Swedish critics. Anders Österling wrote that it was "the most original achievement in our modern prose literature". In his 1990 Eyvind Johnson biography, Örjan Lindberger hailed it as an outstanding work in Johnson's production.

References
Eyvind Johnson Krilon: en roman om det sannolika, Bonniers 1948
Den svenska litteraturen 1920-1950: Modernister och arbetardiktare, Bonniers 1989
Örjan Lindberger Människan i tiden: Eyvind Johnsons liv och författarskap 1938-1976, Bonniers 1990 
Gavin Orton Eyvind Johnson. En monografi Aldus 1974 

Swedish novels
Novels set during World War II
Novels set in the 1940s
Novels set in Stockholm
1941 Swedish novels
1942 novels
1943 Swedish novels
1948 Swedish novels
Novels by Eyvind Johnson